Baab can refer to:

 The Báb (1819-1850), founder of Bábism
 Báb, Nitra District, village in Slovakia
 Heinrich Baab, German Gestapo officer
 Mike Baab, American football player